Reids Creek is a rural locality in the North Burnett Region, Queensland, Australia.

Geography
Reid Creek enters the locality from the north and flows through to become the south-east boundary. Binjour Range forms the western boundary. The Burnett Highway passes through from the south-east to the west.

History 
Reid's Creek Upper Provisional School opened in 1903. On 1 January 1909, it became Reid's Creek Upper State School. It had a closure between 1905 to 1907 due to low student numbers. It closed permanently in 1922. It was in a pocket of  the creek (approx ).

Reid's Creek State School opened in 1909 and closed in 1963. It was on the Burnett Highway.

Norwood State School opened in 1920 and closed in 1952. It was on Reids Creek Road near the intersection with present-day Guyatts Road.

Education 
There are no schools in Reids Creek. The nearest government primary schools are Binjour Plateau State School in neighbouring Binjour to the west and Gayndah State School in Gayndah to the south-east. The nearest secondary school is Burnett State School in Gayndah to the south-east.

References

Further reading 

  — includes short history of the Binjour District, Binjour Plateau State School, Gurgeena State School, Gleneden State School, Fountainebleau State School, Norwood State School, Reid's Creek Upper Creek State School, and Reid's Creek State School.

North Burnett Region
Localities in Queensland